The Temple Owls men's soccer program represents Temple University in all NCAA Division I men's college soccer competitions. Founded in 1926, the Owls compete in the American Athletic Conference. The Owls are coached by Brian Rowland, who was hired as the program's head coach in December 2017. Temple plays their home matches at Temple Owls Sports Complex, on the campus of Temple University.

Coaching history 

Temple University has had seven coaches in their program's existence.

Seasons

NCAA Tournament history 

Temple has appeared in seven NCAA Tournaments. Their most recent appearance came in 1985.

Rivalries 

Located in Philadelphia, the program has long-standing historic rivals with the other university's soccer programs in the area. This includes Drexel of the Colonial Athletic Association, La Salle and Saint Joseph's of the Atlantic 10 Conference, Penn of the Ivy League, and Villanova of the Big East Conference. These five schools are among the Temple's most played opponents. Additionally, Temple has regularly played against Philadelphia U, Penn State, Delaware and Lafayette, due to the school's proximity to Temple.

Historically, the Owls have been rivals with West Chester, but the two sides are now in different divisions, and have not met since 1997.

Record against City 6 teams

Individual honors

All-Americans 
Sixteen players have been named first-team All-Americans.

 1942: Pete Lorenc, Forward
 1944: Walter Bahr, Midfielder
 1945: Fred Barlow, Defender
 1946: Fred Barlow, Defender
 1946: Al Laverson, Midfielder
 1946: Ben McLaughlin, Forward
 1947: John Hughes, Forward
 1947: Tom Lambert, Midfielder
 1948: Tom Lambert, Midfielder
 1952: Jack Dunn, Forward
 1953: Leonard Oliver, Midfielder
 1954: Jack Dunn, Forward
 1954: Leonard Oliver, Midfielder
 1955: Robert Simpson, Midfielder
 1959: Walter Chyzowych, Forward
 1959: James Gallo, Midfielder
 1960: William Charlton, Forward
 1966: John Boles, Midfielder
 1967: Louis Meehl, Midfielder 
 1968: Bob Peffle, Defender

Team honors

National championships 
Temple has won four national championships, all of which were national championships prior to the NCAA Division I Men's Soccer Tournament. In 1941, 1951 and 1953, they were determined as national champions by the Intercollegiate Soccer Football Association, and in 1952 they won the Soccer Bowl.

References 
Primary sources
 
Footnotes

External links
 

 
1926 establishments in Pennsylvania
Soccer clubs in Philadelphia